East Hertfordshire was a parliamentary constituency in the county of Hertfordshire from 1955 to 1983.  It returned one Member of Parliament (MP)  to the House of Commons of the Parliament of the United Kingdom.

History and Boundaries
The constituency was created for the 1955 general election, comprising the Urban Districts of Bishop's Stortford, Cheshunt, Hoddesdon, Sawbridgeworth, and Ware, and the Rural Districts of Braughing and Ware.  The bulk of the constituency was formed from the majority of the Hertford constituency which was significantly revised.  A part of the Rural District of Braughing was transferred from Hitchin. For the February 1974 general election, the Urban District of Ware was transferred to the new constituency of Hertford and Stevenage.

The constituency was abolished for the 1983 general election. Southern parts (consisting the majority of the electorate), largely comprising the former Urban Districts of Cheshunt and Hoddesdon (combined to form the District of Broxbourne under the local government reorganisation of 1974) formed the bulk of the new Borough Constituency of Broxbourne.  With the exception of some rural parts in the north-west of the constituency, which were included in the new County Constituency of Stevenage, the remainder of the seat (including Bishop's Stortford and Sawbridgeworth) was amalgamated with the Hertford and Ware part of Hertford and Stevenage to form the new Hertford and Stortford constituency.

The writer and TV playwright Dennis Potter was the Labour Party candidate in the constituency at the 1964 general election, but finished second behind the Conservative incumbent. His experience inspired Vote, Vote, Vote for Nigel Barton.

Members of Parliament

Elections

Elections in the 1950s

Elections in the 1960s

Elections in the 1970s

References

 Robert Waller, The Almanac of British Politics (1st edition, London: Croom Helm, 1983)
 Frederic A Youngs, jr, Guide to the Local Administrative Units of England, Vol I (London: Royal Historical Society, 1979)

East Hertfordshire
Constituencies of the Parliament of the United Kingdom established in 1955
Constituencies of the Parliament of the United Kingdom disestablished in 1983